Gneiss Point is a rocky point  north of Marble Point, on the coast of Victoria Land, Antarctica. It was first mapped by the British Antarctic Expedition, 1910–13 under Robert Falcon Scott and so named because of gneissic granite found here.

Further reading 
 P.J. FORSYTH, N. MORTIMER & I.M. TURNBULL, Plutonic Rocks from the Cape Roberts Hinterland: Wilson Piedmont Glacier, Southern Victoria Land, Antarctica  , Terra Antartica 2002, 9(2), 57-72 
 Davis, J., & Nichols, R. (1968), The Quantity of Melt Water in the Marble Point–Gneiss Point Area McMurdo Sound, Antarctica, Journal of Glaciology, 7(50), 313-320. doi:10.3189/S0022143000031075

External links 

 Gneiss Point on United States Geological Survey website
  Gneiss Point on the Antarctica New Zealand Digital Asset Manager website
  Gneiss Point on Scientific Committee on Antarctic Research website
 Gneiss Point on marineregions website
 Gneiss Point area map

References 

Headlands of Victoria Land
Scott Coast